The 1858 Wellington Country by-election was a New Zealand by-election held in the single-member electorate of  during the 2nd New Zealand Parliament on 29 July 1858, following the resignation of Dudley Ward. The election was won by Alfred Brandon, who beat the only other candidate, Francis Bradey, easily.

Results

Results by polling booth

Table footnotes

References

Wellington Country 1858
1858 elections in New Zealand
1850s in Wellington
July 1858 events
Politics of the Wellington Region